This is a list of members of the Australian Capital Territory House of Assembly from 1979 to 1982. The ACT was not self-governing at this time.

 Fraser MHA John Clements resigned from the Labor Party in April 1982 after being preselected last on the party's ticket for the 1982 election.

Members of Australian Capital Territory parliaments by term
20th-century Australian politicians